Celso Daniel Caeiro Raposo (born 3 April 1996) is a Portuguese professional footballer who plays for Bulgarian club Lokomotiv Sofia as a defender.

Football career
He made his Taça da Liga debut for Cova da Piedade on 28 July 2019 in a game against Leixões. In July 2021, Raposo signed a two-year contract with Bulgarian club Lokomotiv Sofia.

References

External links

1996 births
Living people
Sportspeople from Barreiro, Portugal
Portuguese footballers
Association football defenders
Liga Portugal 2 players
Campeonato de Portugal (league) players
G.D. Fabril players
S.R. Almancilense players
S.C. Praiense players
C.D. Cova da Piedade players
FC Lokomotiv 1929 Sofia players